The men's team pursuit competition of the cycling events at the 2019 Pan American Games was held on August 3 at the Velodrome.

Records
Prior to this competition, the existing world and Games records were as follows:

Schedule

Results

Qualification
Fastest 2 teams race for the gold and silver medals and 3rd and 4th teams race for the bronze medal.

Finals
The final classification is determined in the medal finals.

References

Track cycling at the 2019 Pan American Games
Men's team pursuit (track cycling)